Film Roman, LLC is an American animation studio currently based in Woodland Hills, California and formerly in Burbank. It was previously owned by Starz Inc., which is now a division of Lionsgate, and currently by Waterman Entertainment, the production company of producer Steve Waterman.

Founded by veteran animator and director Phil Roman on October 26, 1984, it is best known for providing animation for the Garfield primetime specials, based on Jim Davis' comic strip of the same name. The studio also produced the animated series The Simpsons, The Critic, King of the Hill, Family Guy, Wow! Wow! Wubbzy!, The Goode Family, and Dan Vs..

History

Background 
Phil Roman, veteran alumnus of MGM Animation/Visual Arts and Bill Melendez Productions, founded Film Roman on October 26, 1984 as a means to continue the production of the Garfield television specials, since Melendez's own studio was unable to work on both the Peanuts and Garfield specials. Peanuts executive producers Lee Mendelson and Bill Melendez and their aforementioned studio had produced the first two Garfield specials, but due to both Peanuts creator Charles M. Schulz' and Garfield creator Jim Davis' concerns about conflicting interests in allocating production priority at Melendez's boutique studio, the production had to be moved. While he was leaving him and Melendez for his already-established studio, Roman was offered the opportunity to produce the next Garfield prime time special, Garfield in the Rough (1984), for CBS by Mendelson, which he accepted and went on to produce and direct all by himself, winning an Emmy in the process.

Formation 
In 1985, CBS' head of children's programming Judy Price had commissioned an animated television series based on the Garfield prime time special series, later ultimately titled Garfield and Friends, which took three years for Roman to decide developing and producing the program before it eventually aired on the network's Saturday morning time slot, premiering on September 17, 1988. The aforementioned show was Film Roman's first regular series. In 1986, in an effort to expand and diversify the studio, Roman hired Marvel Productions VP of Business Affairs and his own personal attorney, Michael Wahl, as President and Bill Schultz, Marvel's Director of Development, to join in the company as the fledgling studio's VP of Production and Development. Garfield and Friends was expanded to an hour on CBS' number one rated Saturday Morning block and the studio grew to increase its capacity.

In 1988, the new management team developed, sold and produced a new series, Bobby's World, to the brand new Fox Kids Network, headed up by former Marvel Productions president Margaret Loesch. In 1992 to 2016, Film Roman took over the source production of 20th Century Fox's The Simpsons from Klasky-Csupo who had produced the one-minute teaser cartoon shorts  on The Tracey Ullman Show as well as the animation for the first three seasons and the first two episodes of the fourth season (in total 61 episodes). The studio went on to grow and produce many popular animated series now seen all around the world.

Waterman Entertainment ownership 
In 2015, Film Roman was acquired from its parent company Starz Distribution by Waterman Entertainment, the production company of executive producer Steve Waterman. As such, it now does business with Starz, which owns the company's catalogue.

On November 22, 2016, the company formed a joint venture based in Tijuana, called Film Roman Baja J.V. (also known as Film Roman Baja Productions), with Boxel Studios, a Baja California-based animation facility.

Location 
The original studio was located on Riverside Drive in Toluca Lake, California, where Roman was also joined by Melendez producer Lee Mendelson. Years later, the studio moved to a new location on Chandler Blvd. in Studio City, before settling into another location at Starz Plaza on Hollywood Way in Burbank, which it shared with the former Hub Network and Hasbro Studios, and finally settling into its present location in Woodland Hills.

Television series

Films/specials

Miscellaneous 
 Get in Line (Barenaked Ladies music video)
 Frijolero (Molotov music video)
 The Simpsons Game (2007, produced by Electronic Arts) (cutscenes only)
 The Simpsons Ride (2008, amusement simulator ride film produced for the attraction of the same name at Universal Orlando Resort and Universal Studios Hollywood)
 The Simpsons: Tapped Out (2012, freemium mobile game produced for Fox Digital Entertainment and Electronic Arts) (cutscenes only)

Commercials
 Alpo
 Ask Jeeves (2000) (five-minute branding reel)
 Burger King (2001–2003)
 Butterfinger (1992–1994, 1998–2001, 2007)
 CC's (1998)
 C.C. Lemon (2000–2002)
 Embassy Suites Hotel
 Expedia (2003)
 Garfield Fruit Snacks
 General Foods
 Honey Nut Cheerios (1993) (Garfield ad only)
 Intel (1998)
 Matchbox (2002) (CGI sales presentation animated by Forum Visual Effects)
 Microsoft (2003)
 Mirinda (2005–2006, 2008)
 Partnership for a Drug-Free America (2002)
 RC Cola (1999)
 SeaWorld (1998)
 SHO Too (2002)
 Toyota (1992–1993)
 Trix (1991)

Unreleased projects
Blues Brothers: The Animated Series (Canceled due to irreplaceable casting of the original actors)
Big Bug Man (Canceled due to actor Marlon Brando died during production)

See also 
 Phil Roman Entertainment
 Starz Animation
 Klasky Csupo
 Rough Draft Studios
 AKOM
 Wang Film Productions
 Titmouse, Inc.
 Saerom Animation
 Sunwoo Entertainment
 Bardel Entertainment
 Boulder Media
 Mercury Filmworks
 Bento Box Entertainment

References

External links 
 
 

 
Adult animation studios
1984 establishments in California
American animation studios
 Companies based in Burbank, California
Companies based in Los Angeles County, California
Entertainment companies based in California
Entertainment companies established in 1984
Film production companies of the United States
Mass media companies established in 1984
Television production companies of the United States
Former Lionsgate subsidiaries
2015 mergers and acquisitions
American corporate subsidiaries